Live December 2004 A Souvenir of Camber Sands is a live album by Throbbing Gristle released on the night of the performance. The performance and CD are both dedicated to John Balance, who died in November 2004. The CD-R set was on sale minutes after Throbbing Gristle finished performing. Leftovers were available from Mute Records. The CD 1/CD 2 split differs on some of the CD-Rs.

Track listing
CD 1: Part One
P-A D/What a Day/Greasy Spoon/Live-Ray/Hamburger Lady/Almost Like This/The Cigar That Smoked Itself - 55:33
All songs appear on a single track.

CD 2: Part Two
poem/Splitting Sky/Convincing People/Fed Up/Wall of Sound - 36:08
All songs appear on a single track.

References

2004 live albums
Throbbing Gristle live albums
Mute Records live albums